Barr Township is one of ten townships in Daviess County, Indiana. As of the 2010 census, its population was 4,811 and it contained 1,481 housing units.

History
Barr Township was organized on 4 August 1819 from part of Washington Township; its namesake was pioneer settler Hugh Barr.  Besides agriculture, which has flourished in its rich soils, the township has depended economically upon coal mining, as some of Indiana's highest quality coal mines are found in Barr Township.

Geography

Cities and towns
 Cannelburg
 Montgomery

Unincorporated towns
 Black Oak

Adjacent townships
 Van Buren Township (north)
 Perry Township, Martin County (northeast)
 Rutherford Township, Martin County (southeast)
 Reeve Township (south)
 Harrison Township (southwest)
 Washington Township (west)
 Bogard Township (northwest)

Major highways

Cemeteries
The township cemeteries: Saint Peters, Wagler, and St. Mary's (Barr Township)located on St. Mary's Rd.

References
 
 United States Census Bureau cartographic boundary files

External links

 Indiana Township Association
 United Township Association of Indiana

Townships in Daviess County, Indiana
Townships in Indiana
1819 establishments in Indiana
Populated places established in 1819